Haemaphysalis kyasanurensis, is a hard-bodied tick of the genus Haemaphysalis. It is found in India and Sri Lanka. It is a rare obligate ectoparasite of wild animals like Hystrix indica, and many domestic animals.

References 

Ixodidae